Lindsey Stirling is the debut studio album by violinist and artist Lindsey Stirling, whose popularity grew from her appearance on America's Got Talent and a large following on YouTube. Her first album of original compositions, it topped the category of Classical Albums and Dance/Electronic Albums in Billboard and reached number 23 on the Billboard 200. It also was a success in Europe, earning gold certifications in Poland and Switzerland and platinum certifications in Austria and Germany.

On October 29, 2013, the album was re-released worldwide with bonus tracks and achieved its highest-selling week in the United States, reaching number 23 on the Billboard 200 by selling 10,000 copies. Stirling's single "Crystallize" was certified gold by the RIAA. As of March 2019, Lindsey Stirling has sold over 500,000 copies in the United States.

Background and release
The album was recorded over the two years after Lindsey Stirling's appearance on America's Got Talent and was released in 2012. Although Stirling is largely known for her covers, the album is composed almost entirely of her original compositions, featuring Stirling playing violin and backing electronic music on each track created by Stirling and her producers. The album reached number seventy-nine on the Billboard 200, while topping the Billboard Dance/Electronic Albums and Classical Albums charts in the US. It also charted within the top five in Germany, Austria and Switzerland. By April 2013, it had sold 108,000 copies. On October 29, 2013, the album was re-released in the US with 2 bonus tracks, as a Deluxe Edition. The Deluxe Edition with bonus tracks had 3 more exclusive bonus tracks at Target.com and Target retail locations in the US. On February 26, Stirling's album was released in France where it entered in number 17 by selling 4,900 copies.

Stirling's album won platinum certification in Germany and Austria as well as golden certification in Poland and Switzerland. On February 4, Stirling won her first RIIA golden certification for her single "Crystallize".

Stirling has attributed the success of her album to its multitude of original tracks, rather than covers.

Reception

AllMusics James Christopher Monger wrote that the album "carves out a unique new niche in the classical crossover genre," and called the lead single, "Crystallize", "engaging."

Accolades
The album was nominated for Best Electronic/Dance Album for the Billboard Music Awards.

Track listing

Tracks 4, 7, and 10 previously appeared on Stirling's 2010 EP, Lindsey Stomp. Tracks 1, 3, and 9 had been released as standalone digital singles in 2011, 2012, and 2012, respectively.

Re-release
On October 29, 2013, Lindsey Stirling's self-titled studio album was re-released in the US, almost a year after its first official release. The second version of the album consisted mainly of the original setlist, in addition to bonus tracks. The album had some special added bonus tracks if it had been pre-ordered or bought at Target.com or Target retail locations in the US.

On November 8, 2013, Billboard announced that Stirling's studio album had its best sales week ever; by selling 10,000 copies of the extended version of the album; it re-peaked at number 23, passing its previous peak of 79. By May 2014, the album had sold 327,000 copies in total in the United States.

Target bonus tracks

Widespread bonus tracks

Tracks 4, 7, and 10 previously appeared on Stirling's 2010 EP, Lindsey Stomp. Tracks 1, 3, and 9 had been released as standalone digital singles in 2011, 2012, and 2012, respectively.

Songs with * are exclusive at Target.com and Target retail locations in the US.

Personnel
Credits for Lindsey Stirling adapted from liner notes.

 Lindsey Stirling – violin, vocals, executive producer
 AFSHeeN – producer (2)
 Creative Regime – album art
 FIXYN – producer (5)
 Marko G – producer (1, 3, 4, 6–11)
 Devin Graham – photography
 Scott Jarvie – photography
 Poet Name Life – producer (12)
 Chebacca – producer (12)

Charts

Weekly charts

Year-end charts

Certifications

Music videos

See also
 List of number-one electronic albums of 2012 (U.S.)
 List of number-one electronic albums of 2013 (U.S.)

References

2012 debut albums
Lindsey Stirling albums